Norman Michael Hershberger (October 9, 1939 – July 1, 2012) was an American professional baseball player and outfielder for the Chicago White Sox (1961–1964, 1971), Kansas City / Oakland Athletics (1965–1969) and Milwaukee Brewers (1970) during an 11-season Major League Baseball career.

He signed with the White Sox in 1959 after graduating from Massillon High School and attending the University of Cincinnati. He held down a starting corner outfielder job in the majors for seven straight years (1962–1968), and in 1966 led the American League in sacrifice flies (7) during his tenure with the Athletics.

In his 11 MLB seasons, Hershberger played in 1,150 games and had 3,572 at bats, 398 runs, 900 hits, 150 doubles, 22 triples, 26 home runs, 344 runs batted in, 74 stolen bases, 319 walks, .252 batting average, .316 on-base percentage, .328 slugging percentage, 1,172 total bases, 33 sacrifice hits, 28 sacrifice flies and 19 intentional walks. 

He died in Massillon on July 1, 2012, following a brief illness.

References

External links

1939 births
2012 deaths
Baseball players from Ohio
Charleston White Sox players
Chicago White Sox players
Cincinnati Bearcats baseball players
Kansas City Athletics players
Lincoln Chiefs players
Major League Baseball outfielders
Milwaukee Brewers players
Oakland Athletics players
San Diego Padres (minor league) players
Sportspeople from Massillon, Ohio
Tucson Toros players